Muriel Powell, MBE (1889–1972), often referred to as Matron Powell, was the successor to Dame Grace Kimmins in the Chailey Heritage School and was the founder of Searchlight which continued the work of the Chailey Heritage School for students from age 15 into adulthood.

From 1924 until her resignation in 1933, Powell was Matron of the Chailey Heritage Marine Hospital, at Tide Mills, East Sussex.

References

1889 births
1972 deaths
English philanthropists
Members of the Order of the British Empire
Date of birth missing
Date of death missing
Place of birth missing
Place of death missing
People from Lewes District
20th-century British philanthropists